Pandit M. Venkatesh Kumar (born July 1, 1953) is an Indian Hindustani vocalist. He is best known for his rendition of devotional songs composed by Swami Haridas and Kanakadasa. Kumar belongs to the  Kirana and  Gwalior Gharana.

Early life and musical training
Kumar was born in Lakshmipura in the Bellary region of northern Karnataka. Kumar's late father Huleppa was a Janapada folk singer and leather puppeteer. In 1968, when he was 15 years old, Venkatesh was taken by his uncle Belagallu Veeranna to the Veereshwara Punyashrama in Gadag, run by the Veerashaiva saint and Hindustani musician Puttaraj Gawai. For the next 12 years, he lived at the ashram and learned Hindustani singing in the Gwalior and Kirana styles under Gawai. Kumar blends these styles in his presentations, though he admits to influences beyond these gharanas, chief among them being Bade Ghulam Ali Khan of the Patiala gharana. His guru was also trained in Carnatic music, and as a result, there are traces of Carnatic elements in Pandit Kumar's music, especially in his sargam patterns.

Career
Kumar got his first break in 1993, 14 years after he left the ashram, when he received an invitation from Bhimsen Joshi to perform at the Sawai Gandharva Sangeet Mahotsav in Pune. However, he had to wait almost ten more years before he became a regular on the national festival circuit. Since then, he has been featured in many national musical programs, and has been an "A top" grade artist of All India Radio since 1988.

In devotional music, Kumar is most acclaimed for his Kannada vachana and dasara pada singing. He has recorded multiple devotional and classical CD albums.

Teaching
Kumar began his teaching career at Vijay Mahantesh Arts College near Gadag, where he taught for one-and-a-half years. He has also taught in Mukunda Kripa in Udupi.

He received a postgraduate degree in music from Gandharva Mahavidyalaya. He authored the textbook of music prescribed for the examination conducted by the government of Karnataka.

Kumar taught at the University College of Music, Dharwad, for 33 years. This commitment regularly required him to turn down concerts, but he refused to quit the job that offered him stability at a time when concerts were hard to come by. He retired in 2015.

Awards
Kumar has received awards and titles including:

 Karnataka Rajyotsava Award (1999)
 Karnataka Sangeet Natya Academy Award (2007)
 Vatsala Bhimsen Joshi Award (2008)
 Krishna Hangal Award (2009)
 Sangeet Natak Akademi Award (2012)
 Honorary Doctorate from Karnataka University, Dharwad (2014)
 Padma Shri Award by the Government of India (2016)
 Gangubai Hangal National Award (2017)
 Kalidas Samman by Madhya Pradesh government. (for the year 2017. Awarded in 2021).
Honorary Doctorate from Sri Sathya Sai university for human excellence, Muddenahalli (2022).

References

Hindustani singers
Living people
Recipients of the Padma Shri in arts
1953 births
People from Dharwad district
Singers from Karnataka
Recipients of the Sangeet Natak Akademi Award
20th-century Indian male classical singers